WLRX (106.1 FM) and  WAWX (101.7 FM) are FM radio stations owned by the Educational Media Foundation (EMF).  WLRX is licensed to Vinton, Virginia, serving the Roanoke metropolitan area.  WAWX is licensed to Lynchburg, Virginia, serving the Lynchburg metropolitan area.  WLRX plays a Contemporary Christian radio format from the "K-Love" national network, while WAWX airs a Contemporary Worship format as a network affiliate of "Air1."  

Both stations are licensed for commercial operation.  But K-Love and Air1 are listener-supported and run no commercials.  In addition, EMF owns 106.9 WLGX in nearby Bedford, Virginia.  WLGX also carries K-Love programming.

Combined 106.1/101.7 history
106.1 FM started out with the call sign WWFO on January 18, 1991 and officially launched in 1994.

101.7 FM started out with the call sign WDMS-FM on August 1, 1964 before being changed to WJJS in 1969 with a Black music format. In 1986 the calls and format moved to its sister station at 1320 AM, while the FM became Top-40 as "U102" WXYU. On January 1, 1992, the Urban format and WJJS calls returned to 101.7, while WXYU, by then a Country station, moved to AM.

In 1994, the frequencies began a simulcast as "Jammin' 101.7 and 106.1" and 106.1 FM as a rhythmic top 40 format. 101.7 FM moved its callsign, WJJS to 106.1 FM on May 18, 1994, while 101.7 FM became WJJX on April 29, 1994. On August 29, 1996, 106.1 FM modified the callsign to WJJS-FM and the WJJS call sign was returned to 1320 AM (now WVGM).

In 1998, WJJS-FM/WJJX shifted to contemporary hit radio and began a serious challenge to take on the area's longtime rival WXLK in a battle would last for nearly seven years, even though they maintained a Rhythmic lean during that tenure.

But by 2005, WJJS-FM/WJJX would start shifting back towards a pure rhythmic direction as they began phasing out non-rhythmic product, resulting in a complete return to rhythmic top 40 in the Spring of 2006.

At noon on December 17, 2007, the WZBL call sign and classic country format was moved from 104.9 FM to 106.1 FM as "106.1 The Bull". This was part of a frequency swap that moved the WJJS call letters to 104.9 FM as "Jammin' JJS". On the same date, the 101.7 FM "WJJX" simulcast was also swapped with WSNV, which had been broadcasting on 102.7 FM, simulcasting WSNV at 93.5 FM.

At noon on March 27, 2009, the format was changed to adult hits as "106.1 Steve FM; Playing Whatever We Want". The new callsign, WSFF, went into effect a day later on March 28. By late 2012, the slogan changed to "Random Radio". At 5:00 P.M. on March 25, 2011, WSFF began simulcasting on WSNZ at 101.7 FM, once again reuniting 106.1 FM with 101.7 FM.

WSFF was part of a group of stations owned by Clear Channel that are scheduled to be sold as part of Clear Channel's conversion from a public to a private company.

The station formerly broadcast all Virginia Tech sporting events including Hokies football and basketball games until the start of the 2011-2012 year when it was moved to WSNV.

On March 3, 2019, iHeart announced it would sell four stations in its Aloha Station Trust, including WSFF and WSNZ, to the Educational Media Foundation in exchange for six translators already operated by iHeart. The stations were expected to flip to one of EMF's national networks (K-Love, Air 1, or K-Love Classics) upon the sale's closure.

On May 31, 2019, EMF closed the sale and flipped its format to their "K-Love" branding while "Steve-FM" was moved to sister station WJJS. EMF also changed call letters to WLRX for Roanoke and WAWX for Lynchburg. Sometime in 2020, WAWX has split from the simulcast and has since flipped to EMF's Contemporary Worship network, Air1.

References

External links

Radio stations established in 1995
1995 establishments in Virginia
Educational Media Foundation radio stations
K-Love radio stations
LRX (FM)